Guillermo Guardia Morales (born 27 February 1960) is considered one of the best Costa Rican soccer strikers during the 1980s.

Club career
Nicknamed Nica, Guardia played the greatest years of his career for Deportivo Saprissa, where he became the best goal scorer of the Costa Rica's first division during 1981, year when Saprissa finished being the champion. Later he played for Alajuelense and San Carlos among others, totalling 7 different clubs. He is especially remembered for saving an Alajuelense penalty kick when Turrialba goalkeeper Miguel Segura was sent off in a league game and Guardia replaced him in goal on 31 May 1992.

Guardia's great scoring talents and quickness, helped him and teammate Evaristo Coronado form a lethal duo in the early 80s in Saprissa. He scored a total of 149 league goals.

International career
He played with the Costa Rica national football team as well, and was part of Costa Rican squad that played at the 1984 Olympic Games held in Los Angeles.

Managerial career
After retiring, he began his coaching career, and has managed several teams in Costa Rica's first division, such as Pérez Zeledón, Municipal Liberia and San Carlos.

References

1960 births
Living people
Footballers from San José, Costa Rica
Association football forwards
Costa Rican footballers
Costa Rica international footballers
Olympic footballers of Costa Rica
Footballers at the 1984 Summer Olympics
Deportivo Saprissa players
A.D. San Carlos footballers
L.D. Alajuelense footballers
Municipal Pérez Zeledón footballers
Costa Rican football managers
Liga FPD players